Indestructible may refer to:

Music
 Indestructible Record Company, an American record label 1906–1925

Albums
 Indestructible (Art Blakey album), 1966
 Indestructible (Disturbed album) or the title song (see below), 2008
 Indestructible (Elvis Crespo album) or the title song, 2010
 Indestructible (Rancid album) or the title song, 2003
 Indestructible (Rubén González album) or the title song, 1975
 Indestructible!, by Anita O'Day, 2006
 Indestructible, by Diego el Cigala, 2016
 Indestructible, by the Four Tops, 1988
 Indestructible, by K-otic, 2002
 Indestructible, by Lisa Nilsson, 1990

Songs
 "Indestructible" (Disturbed song), 2008
 "Indestructible" (Matthew Good Band song), 1998
 "Indestructible" (Robyn song), 2010
 "Indestructible", by Girls' Generation from The Best, 2014
 "Indestructible", by Goo Goo Dolls from Miracle Pill, 2019

Other uses
 Indestructible (video game), a 2012 vehicular combat game
 Indestructibility, a mathematical concept

See also
 Invincible (disambiguation)
 Unbreakable (disambiguation)